Aleksandr Dmitriyevich Zuyev (born 26 June 1996) is a Russian football player who plays as a right-back for PFC Krylia Sovetov Samara. For the most of his career he played as a left winger and in other attacking positions.

Career

Club
Zuyev made his professional debut in the Russian Professional Football League for FC Spartak-2 Moscow on 9 April 2014 in a game against FC Tambov, with his debut for FC Spartak Moscow coming on 23 September 2014 in a Russian Cup game against FC Smena Komsomolsk-na-Amure. Zuyev's Russian Premier League debut came on 19 October 2014 in a game against FC Ural Sverdlovsk Oblast.

On 17 February 2017, Zuyev joined FC Krylia Sovetov Samara on loan for the remainder of the 2016–17 season.

On 23 June 2017, he agreed on a season-long loan with FC Rostov.

On 27 May 2018, he moved to FC Rostov on a permanent basis, signing a 4-year contract. On 30 September 2018, he scored the only goal of the game 12 minutes after coming off the bench in the second half to help Rostov defeat his former club FC Spartak Moscow in an away game.

On 2 September 2019, he joined FC Rubin Kazan on loan for the 2019–20 season. On 10 August 2020, Rubin bought out his rights on a permanent basis.

On 14 July 2022, Zuyev signed a two-year contract with FC Khimki.

On 21 February 2023, Zuyev returned to PFC Krylia Sovetov Samara until the end of the 2022–23 season.

International
Zuyev won the 2013 UEFA European Under-17 Championship with Russia national under-17 football team, with which he also participated in the 2013 FIFA U-17 World Cup.

Later he represented Russia national under-19 football team at the 2015 UEFA European Under-19 Championship, where Russia came in second place.

Career statistics

References

1996 births
People from Kostanay
Living people
Russian footballers
Russia youth international footballers
Russia under-21 international footballers
Association football midfielders
FC Spartak-2 Moscow players
FC Spartak Moscow players
PFC Krylia Sovetov Samara players
FC Rostov players
FC Rubin Kazan players
FC Khimki players
Russian Premier League players
Russian First League players
Russian Second League players